Syed Mohammad Shahed is a Bangladeshi professor, researcher, writer and a former Director General of Bangla Academy. He received Bangla Academy Award in essay and research category in 2018.

Shahed obtained his Bachelor's, Master's and PhD from the University of Dhaka in Bangla language and literature. In 1988, he started his career as a faculty member in Bangla Department of the same university. From 13 May 2007 to 12 May 2009, he served as the Director General of Bangla Academy.

References

Living people
Bangladeshi male writers
Recipients of Bangla Academy Award
Academic staff of the University of Dhaka
Year of birth missing (living people)